Maťovské Vojkovce is a village and municipality in Michalovce District in the Košice Region of eastern Slovakia.

History
In historical records the village was first mentioned in 1302.

Geography
The municipality has a population of about 590 people.

Gallery

See also
 List of municipalities and towns in Michalovce District
 List of municipalities and towns in Slovakia

External links

 https://web.archive.org/web/20070513023228/http://www.statistics.sk/mosmis/eng/run.html

Villages and municipalities in Michalovce District